"KK" is a song by American rapper Wiz Khalifa featuring fellow American rappers Juicy J and Project Pat, from his fifth studio album Blacc Hollywood (2014). On July 15, 2014, it was released by Rostrum Records and Atlantic Records as the album's first promotional single. It was produced by Jim Jonsin, Finatik N Zac, and JayFrance (formerly known as Micah J Foxx).

Music video
On May 15, 2011, the music video was released for "KK".

Track listing
Digital download
"KK" (featuring Juicy J and Project Pat) - 4:09

Chart performance

References

2014 singles
2014 songs
Wiz Khalifa songs
Juicy J songs
Atlantic Records singles
Song recordings produced by Jim Jonsin
Songs written by Wiz Khalifa
Songs written by Jim Jonsin
Songs written by Juicy J